James Cate Armistead (August 29, 1905 – March 1984) was an American college football player.

Early years
James Cate Armistead was born on August 29, 1905 in Nashville, Tennessee to Wirt Mayo Armistead and Sarah Adeline Cate.

High school
Armistead attended Hume-Fogg High School in Nashville, Tennessee. The first game played at Dudley Field was between the home-standing Commodores and the powerful Michigan Wolverines. A goal-line stand by the Commodores preserved a 0-0 tie.  The following Friday, nearby Hume-Fogg High School played a game at Dudley. Senior Jimmie Armistead returned the opening kick for a touchdown, providing the first touchdown ever recorded in the stadium.

Vanderbilt
Armistead was a prominent running back for the Vanderbilt Commodores of Vanderbilt University from 1926 to 1928. He was also bald, called by one writer "the bald eagle of Vanderbilt."

1926
He started slow; "Nature neglected to endow him with pugnacity; Or even aggressiveness. As a sophomore, he was so timid on attack that he was as easy to snuff out as a candle."  He was always shy, and took no joy in seeing his opponent fail. In 1926, Vanderbilt lost its only game to national champion Alabama. Armistead once caught a pass in the game and was tackled just a few yards short of the goal without fighting for extra yardage. From there Vanderbilt failed to score; and so some Vanderbilt fans blamed Armistead for the loss.

1927
He took the criticism of 1926 to heart and emerged a new player in 1927. Armistead led the nation in scoring in 1927 with 138 points, a year in which he was a target of quarterback Bill Spears.

1928
When Spears graduated, Armistead was the triple-threat option, i.e. he now had to pass and kick, as well as captain. Armistead starred in the 14 to 7 victory over Kentucky. He made the second-team of the composite All-Southern eleven behind Florida quarterback Clyde Crabtree.

See also
 List of NCAA major college football yearly scoring leaders

References

Vanderbilt Commodores football players
American football running backs
American football quarterbacks
All-Southern college football players
1905 births
1984 deaths
Players of American football from Nashville, Tennessee